Rijo or Rijō may refer to:

People
 Audris Rijo (b. 1985), a Dominican professional model and actress
 José Rijo (b. 1965), a Dominican former baseball player
 Luis Rijo (1927–2001), a Uruguayan footballer
 Wanda Rijo (b. 1979), a Dominican former weightlifter
 Washington García Rijo (1921–2010), a Uruguayan political figure

Other uses
 , sometimes called 
 , a Japanese amateur football club